The United Kingdom participated in the Eurovision Song Contest 2003 with the song "Cry Baby" written by Martin Isherwood. The song was performed by the duo Jemini. The British entry for the 2003 contest in Riga, Latvia was selected via the national final A Song for Europe 2003, organised by the British broadcaster BBC. Eight acts competed in the national final which consisted of a semi-final and a final, during which the winner was selected entirely through a regional televote.

In the final of the Eurovision Song Contest, the United Kingdom performed in position 15 and placed twenty-sixth (last) out of the 26 participating countries, failing to score any points. This was the first time the nation had placed last in the history of the competition and also the first time the nation received nul points.

Background

Prior to the 2003 contest, the United Kingdom has participated in the Eurovision Song Contest forty-five times. Thus far, the United Kingdom has won the contest five times: in 1967 with the song "Puppet on a String" performed by Sandie Shaw, in 1969 with the song "Boom Bang-a-Bang" performed by Lulu, in 1976 with the song "Save Your Kisses for Me" performed by Brotherhood of Man, in 1981 with the song "Making Your Mind Up" performed by Bucks Fizz and in 1997 with the song "Love Shine a Light" performed by Katrina and the Waves. To this point, the nation is noted for having finished as the runner-up in a record fifteen contests. Up to and including 1998, the UK had only twice finished outside the top 10, in 1978 and 1987. Since 1999, the year in which the rule was abandoned that songs must be performed in one of the official languages of the country participating, the UK has had less success, thus far only finishing within the top ten once: in 2002 with the song "Come Back" performed by Jessica Garlick.

The British national broadcaster, BBC, broadcasts the event within the United Kingdom and organises the selection process for the nation's entry. BBC announced that the United Kingdom would participate in the Eurovision Song Contest 2003 on 3 September 2002. BBC has traditionally organised a national final featuring a competition among several artists and songs to choose the British entry for Eurovision. For their 2003 entry, the broadcaster announced that a national final involving a public vote would be held to select United Kingdom's entry.

Before Eurovision

A Song for Europe 2003 
A Song for Europe 2003 was the national final developed by the BBC in order to select the British entry for the Eurovision Song Contest 2003. Eight acts competed in the competition which consisted of a semi-final between 27 and 31 January 2003, and a televised final on 2 March 2003. The semi-final was broadcast on BBC Radio 2, while the final was broadcast on BBC One.

Competing entries 
On 3 September 2002, BBC announced an open submission for interested artists to submit their songs. A fee was also imposed on songs being submitted to the national final, with under £20 for artists aged 17 or under and £110 for artists aged over 17. The submission period lasted until 18 October 2002. The 700 received submissions were reviewed and a twenty-song shortlist was compiled by the British Academy of Songwriters, Composers and Authors (BASCA). The shortlist was then presented to a professional panel consisting of representatives of the BBC and the BASCA as well as music industry experts that ultimately selected eight semi-finalists to compete in the national final. Prior to the final, Esther Hart withdrew from the national final in favour of competing in the Dutch national final (which she eventually won with the song "One More Night") and was replaced by United Colours of Sound as the performer of "Wait for the Moment". The group later withdrew from the national final as well and was replaced by Simon Chapman. The song was then rewritten and retitled as "Now and Forever".

Semi-final
The eight competing acts were premiered during The Ken Bruce Show and Wake Up to Wogan on BBC Radio 2 on 27 January 2003, and the public was able to vote for their favourite song through televoting and online voting until 31 January 2003, with the top four songs proceeding to the final. The public vote in the semi-final registered over 30,000 votes.

Final
Four acts competed in the televised final on 2 March 2003 held at the BBC Television Centre in London and hosted by Terry Wogan. A regional televote selected the winner, "Cry Baby" performed by Jemini. The spokespersons for the regional televoting of Southern England, Wales, Northern Ireland, Midlands, Northern England and Scotland were, accordingly: Esther Rantzen, Jessica Garlick, Joe Mace, Mel and Sue, Matt Baker and Nicholas Parsons. The public vote in the final registered over 100,000 votes.

12 points

At Eurovision
As a member of the "Big Four", the United Kingdom automatically qualified to compete in the Eurovision Song Contest 2003 on 24 May 2003. During the running order draw on 1 December 2002, the United Kingdom was placed to perform in position 15, following the entry from Netherlands and before the entry from Ukraine. The United Kingdom placed twenty-sixth (last) in the final, failing to score any points. This was the first time the United Kingdom finished in last place and also the first time the nation received nul points.

In the United Kingdom, the show was televised on BBC One with commentary by Terry Wogan and broadcast on BBC Radio 2 with commentary by Ken Bruce. The British spokesperson, who announced the British votes during the final, was Lorraine Kelly.

Voting 
Below is a breakdown of points awarded to the United Kingdom and awarded by the United Kingdom in the contest. The nation awarded its 12 points to Ireland in the contest. It was later revealed that Turkey would have been awarded with 12 points from the nation had a backup jury be used.

Points awarded to the United Kingdom 
The United Kingdom did not receive any points at the 2003 Eurovision Song Contest.

Points awarded by the United Kingdom

Notes

References 

2003
Countries in the Eurovision Song Contest 2003
Eurovision
Eurovision